Großer Plöner See is an Amt ("collective municipality") in the districts of Plön and Ostholstein in Schleswig-Holstein, Germany. It is situated around Plön, which is the seat of the Amt, but not part of it. The Amt is named after the lake Großer Plöner See.

Overview
It is one of the two Ämter (with Itzstedt) in Germany that joins municipalities into two different districts, but only Bosau is located in Ostholstein.

Subdivision
The Amt Großer Plöner See consists of the following municipalities:
Bosau (Ostholstein district)
Dersau
Dörnick 
Grebin
Kalübbe 
Lebrade 
Nehmten 
Rantzau 
Rathjensdorf 
Wittmoldt

References

External links
 Amt Großer Plöner See official site

Ämter in Schleswig-Holstein